Michael H. Tulloch (born 1961/1962) is a Canadian judge. On December 19, 2022, Prime Minister Justin Trudeau announced the appointment of Tulloch as the new Chief Justice of Ontario. He is the first Black judge appointed to the Ontario Court of Appeal and the first Black Chief Justice of any province.

He attended Central Peel Secondary School in Brampton, Ontario, York University in Toronto, and Osgoode Hall Law School. After graduating from law school in 1989, he became an assistant Crown attorney in 1991, and later worked as a private defence lawyer. In 2003, he was appointed as a judge to the Ontario Superior Court of Justice. He was appointed to the Court of Appeal effective June 30, 2012.

In 2013 Tulloch was one of the recipients of the Top 25 Canadian Immigrant Awards presented, by Canadian Immigrant Magazine.

Tulloch is a former president of the Canadian Association of Black Lawyers. He was born in Jamaica and came to Canada when he was 9 years old.

References

External links

1960s births
Living people
Year of birth missing (living people)
Jamaican emigrants to Canada
Justices of the Court of Appeal for Ontario
Osgoode Hall Law School alumni
People from Brampton
York University alumni